(also ; often known simply as ) was one of the great ocean-going, voyaging canoes that was used in the migrations that settled the South Island according to Māori tradition.

 is linked to many southern , first landing near Nelson. The  was captained by Rākaihautū, who was accompanied by his wife Waiariki-o-āio, their son Te Rakihouia, and a man named Matiti.

Origins 
Originally,  was said to belong to a chief from Te Patunuioāio named Taitewhenua. He decided to give the canoe to the renowned  (astronomer) Matiti, who then gave it to Rākaihautū and encouraged him to use it to explore new lands.

In the 9th century, Rākaihautū, accompanied by his wife Waiariki-o-āio, their son Te Rakihouia, Matiti, and other kin of the Te Kāhui Tipua, Te Kāhui Roko, and Te Kāhui Waitaha tribes, set sail across the Pacific Ocean in search of new land.

Voyage and arrival 

From Nelson, Rākaihautū and his wife separated from Te Rakihouia and began to explore the Southern Alps down to Foveaux Strait, digging out the island's great lakes and waterways as he went. Te Rakihouia and Waitaa (or Waitaha) took the canoe and continued down the east coast, naming the cliffs at Kaikōura  (The Food Storehouse of Rakihouia) and eventually finding a lake at Banks Peninsula now called Lake Ellesmere / Te Waihora, naming its coastline  (The Eel Weirs Of Te Rakihouia). The canoe continued, and eventually landed at the mouth of the Clutha River, which they named  (or ).

Both parties moved back up the east coast from the southerly points that they each landed, meeting at Waihao, near the Waitaki River where the canoe now makes up part of the riverbed at Wai Kakahi (near Glenavy).

See also 

 List of Māori waka

Notes

References

External links 
 Terea te Waka, a chant that recalls the voyage of the 

Māori mythology
Māori waka